Vaccination in Bangladesh includes all aspects of vaccination in Bangladesh.

A 2020 study reported that the cost of a malaria vaccination program in Bangladesh would be cost effective in terms of increasing the people's disability-adjusted life years.

Bangladesh had its first outbreak of avian influenza in 2007 and the disease continues to be a national problem. Part of the response that scientists recommend is the development of vaccination programs, but this has been difficult.

A 2016 program to provide HPV vaccines to girls created a range of ethical issues for communities. The source of all the problems was that the design of the vaccination program came from foreign people outside the country who had no understanding of local cultural norms. There was an attempt at local consultation, but unexpected problems happened anyway. Problems included lack of public health education for the communities receiving the vaccine, forcefulness and lack of consent in arranging for girls to take the vaccine, a lack of planning to treat adverse side effects of vaccination, and a lack of female leadership and empowerment in running a health program for females.

There are multiple cholera vaccines available in Bangladesh as well as multiple strategies for making them available to people who need them. While there is major government support for vaccination, there is debate and research about how to manage the vaccination program to make it more efficient.

Bangladesh has experienced outbreaks of the Nipah virus and although a vaccine exists, the vaccine option is not well developed and preventing outbreaks without vaccines is a better option in this case.

Bangladesh began a vaccination program for congenital rubella syndrome in 2012 and since then, cases have gone down greatly.

COVID-19 vaccination 

Bangladesh began the administration of COVID-19 vaccines on 27 January 2021 while mass vaccination started on 7 February 2021.

References 

Bangladesh
Healthcare in Bangladesh